Adalberto Velasco Antillón is a Mexican politician affiliated with the Green Ecological Party of Mexico (PVEM).  He was the PVEM candidate to the 2006 Jalisco gubernatorial elections, receiving 1% of the vote. Velasco served as municipal president (mayor) of Villa Corona from 2004 to 2006.

References

Ecologist Green Party of Mexico politicians
Municipal presidents in Jalisco
Politicians from Jalisco
Living people
Year of birth missing (living people)